is a town located in Oshima Subprefecture, Hokkaido, Japan. The former home of the Matsumae Han, it has an Edo period castle, Matsumae Castle, the only one in Hokkaido, and Ryūun-in.

History 

1900: Fukuyama town was founded.
1940: Fukuyama changed its name to Matsumae.
1953: Matsumae Line opened.
1954: Matsumae town, Oshima village, Osawa village, and Kojima village were merged to form Matsumae town.
1988: Matsumae Line was abolished.

Geography
The town is located on the southern end of the Matsumae Peninsula. In addition the town governs the two islands in the Tsugaru Strait, Oshima and Kojima.

Along with Kaminokuni, Hokkaido, and Fukushima, Hokkaido, Matsumae shares a border with Mount Daisengen, and contains the newest and shortest climbing route to the summit of the mountain.

Climate

Demographics
As of September 2016, the town has an estimated population of 7,843 and a density of 26.7 persons per km2.

Culture and lifestyle 
Surrounding Matsumae Castle is Matsumae Park, which features over 10,000 cherry trees of over 250 varieties, and is ranked among the top cherry blossom viewing spots in the country.

Education

High school
 Hokkaido Matsumae High School (the southernmost high school in Hokkaido)

Sister cities
 Omihachiman, Shiga (since 1984) 
 Masaki, Ehime (since 1990) 
 Date, Fukushima (since 2011)

References

External links

Official Website 

 
Towns in Hokkaido